Alpha-1,6-mannosyl-glycoprotein 2-beta-N-acetylglucosaminyltransferase is an enzyme that in humans is encoded by the MGAT2 gene.

The product of this gene is a Golgi enzyme catalyzing an essential step in the conversion of oligomannose to complex N-glycans. The enzyme has the typical glycosyltransferase domains: a short N-terminal cytoplasmic domain, a hydrophobic non-cleavable signal-anchor domain, and a C-terminal catalytic domain. Mutations in this gene may lead to carbohydrate-deficient glycoprotein syndrome, type II. The coding region of this gene is intronless. Transcript variants with a spliced 5' UTR may exist, but their biological validity has not been determined.

References

Further reading

External links
  GeneReviews/NCBI/NIH/UW entry on Congenital Disorders of Glycosylation Overview